Tarkhuna or Tarhun is a Georgian carbonated soft drink that is flavoured with tarragon or woodruff. It was first created in the Kutais Governorate of the Russian Empire in 1887, by a young Georgian pharmacist named Mitrofan Lagidze in the city of Kutaisi.
Mitrofan Lagidze began to add odorous chukhpuch containing extract of Caucasian tarragon to sparkling water with natural syrups of his own production. Before the First World War, Lagidze repeatedly received gold medals at international exhibitions for his water. In 1927, the Soviet authorities built a plant for the production of "Lagidze water" in Tbilisi, and Lagidze himself was appointed director.

Availability
As of 2019, tarkhuna is produced in Georgia under "Natakhtari" and "Zedazeni" brands; in Lithuania under "Selita Klasika" as "Tarchunas"; and in Russia, where one of the producers is OAO Narzan under the brand "Ледяная Жемчужина" as "Тархун". The drink became available on the general USSR market for the first time in 1981. The pilot batch was sold on the territory of the Main Botanical Garden of the USSR Academy of Sciences in standard 0.33 liter bottles. Subsequently, its recipe was transferred to food industry enterprises, and, since 1983, "Tarhun" began to be sold in many republics of the USSR and administrative regions of the RSFSR in bottles of 0.33 and 0.5 liters.

Trademark status 
In a trademark dispute between OÜ Acerra and AS Tallinna Karastusjoogid, the Estonian Ministry of Economic Affairs and Communications determined that the word Tarhun is a descriptive term for the drink, and is thus not trademarkable under the laws of the Republic of Estonia. In Estonia, it was possible to find both the Estonian-made and Russian-made Tarhun drinks from the same soft drinks aisle, as the soft drink is distilled and bottled in both countries, though by different companies and with slightly different recipes. In 2015, the Estonian soft drinks company AS Tallinna Karastusjoogid, who were the local producer and distributor of "Tarhun", ceased operations, and its owner AS Haljas put the producer on sale to a 'foreign investor', whose name and country of origin has remained unknown. As of 2019, stores in Estonia variously sell tarkhuna lemonades made in Georgia, Lithuania, and Russia; though none of these tarkhuna brands has reached universal distribution across most store chains.

References 

Soft drinks
Russian drinks
Georgian drinks
1887 introductions